Oyster nut (or its variants) may refer to either:

 Telfairia, a plant genus;
 Telfairia pedata, a species within the genus Telfairia